How to Steal a Wife is a 2013 Lithuanian comedy film directed by Donatas Ulvydas.

Summary 
What would happen if, just before the New Year's Day, you would lock up a woman and her two men – one, a husband, and the other, an ex–husband? And what if the latter was accused of stealing a large sum of money (the fact that he denies himself)? Is it true that old love never withers, especially when 300 million litas are involved? Four people attempt to resolve the ages–old debate of whether love is stronger than money.

References 

2013 comedy films
2013 films
Lithuanian comedy films